File is a Turkish retail company founded in 2015, owned by Bim. Unlike Bim whose stores are mostly discounters, File's locations are made up of hypermarkets. As of April 2021, the company has 135 locations and around 4,000 employees.

All of the company's 135 locations are in Turkey.

History 
In 2015, Bim wanted to invest in the supermarket category after claiming their title as one of the dominant companies in the Turkish discount store industry, thus founding File. The companys first store was opened inside the Prestige Shopping Mall in İstanbul, Başakşehir. The company has their own subsidiaries as well, such as Harras which is the producer of baked goods sold in File stores and Actisoft which is the producer of household cleaning products.

In 2021, the company developed an grocery delivery app called "File Market".

References 

Retail companies of Turkey
Supermarkets
2015 establishments in Turkey
Supermarkets of Turkey